Robert Edward Hornblow (14 June 1861 – 21 October 1937) was a New Zealand politician, auctioneer, reporter and newspaper proprietor.

Business career
Hornblow was born in Wellington in 1861, the son of  Charles William Hornblow. He grew up in Greytown in the Wairarapa. He received little education and started work from the age of ten. He was an apprentice at the Greytown Standard for six years and in 1882, he worked as a compositor for the New Zealand Times in Wellington. He returned to Greytown and worked at the Greytown Standard as a reporter. This was followed by a short period of the Greytown representative for the New Zealand Times, and four years each at the Wairarapa Star and the Wairarapa Daily. He started his own printing business in 1891 in Masterton and sold it in 1894. He then became an auctioneer and land agent.

In later life, he owned newspapers in Mangaweka, Dargaville, Whangarei, Rawene, and Kohukohu.

Political career
Hornblow stood for the New Zealand House of Representatives several times during his life. In the 1909 Rangitikei by-election, he came last of the five candidates in the first ballot. In the  he stood for the Bay of Islands electorate again against Harold Rushworth as an Independent Labour candidate, placing third out of four candidates.

Hornblow was mayor of Dargaville from 1919 to 1925.

Private life
On 21 February 1889 at Greytown, he married Emily Sarah Perry of Masterton. They had a son and a daughter, and divorced in December 1906. His first wife remarried in Nelson the following year.

Hornblow married Rose Lavinia Spain in March 1907 in Dunedin. There were no children from this marriage, they separated in December 1927 and were divorced in June 1931.

References

1861 births
1937 deaths
People from Greytown, New Zealand
Mayors of places in the Northland Region
New Zealand Liberal Party politicians
Unsuccessful candidates in the 1902 New Zealand general election
Unsuccessful candidates in the 1905 New Zealand general election
Unsuccessful candidates in the 1908 New Zealand general election
Unsuccessful candidates in the 1911 New Zealand general election
Unsuccessful candidates in the 1914 New Zealand general election
Unsuccessful candidates in the 1919 New Zealand general election
Unsuccessful candidates in the 1922 New Zealand general election
Unsuccessful candidates in the 1925 New Zealand general election
Unsuccessful candidates in the 1928 New Zealand general election
Unsuccessful candidates in the 1935 New Zealand general election